My Bugoy Goes to Congress is a 1987 Filipino political comedy film directed by Jett C. Espiritu and starring Dolphy, Nora Aunor and Dolphy's son Eric Quizon. It is the sequel to the 1979 film Bugoy. Produced by RVQ Productions and Shining Star Productions, the film was released on May 7, 1987. Critic Justino Dormiendo of the Manila Standard gave the film a negative review for its formulaic and ineffective comedy, and observed that "Contrary to our expectations, Bugoy [...] does not go to congress."

Cast
Dolphy as Bugoy
Nora Aunor as Cathy
Eric Quizon
Panchito
Rachel Anne Wolfe
Paquito Diaz as Don Drigo Absalom
Dencio Padilla
Babalu
Don Pepot
Tiya Pusit
Subas Herrero
Zeny Zabala
Teroy de Guzman
Georgie Quizon
Caselyn Francisco
Max Vera
Rey Q. Bayona Jr.

Critical response
Justino Dormiendo, writing for the Manila Standard, gave the film a negative review, criticizing it as thoroughly formulaic and unfunny, while noting that "Contrary to our expectations, Bugoy [...] does not go to congress." He stated that "This is an idiotic non-movie cashing in on the audience appeal of the latest electoral contest, a subject that should be more effectively tackled in satire or parody, which this film is doubly ignorant of."

References

External links

1987 films
1980s political comedy films
1987 comedy films
Filipino-language films
Films about elections
Philippine comedy films
Philippine sequel films
Films directed by Jett C. Espiritu